The China Railways SL4 (勝利4, Shènglì, "victory") class steam locomotive was a class of 4-6-2 passenger steam locomotives operated by the China Railway. They were originally built for South Manchuria Railway (Mantetsu), where they were designated Pashishi (パシニ) class. Mantetsu's 1938 "Pashishi" classification was made up of two distinct classes of locomotive, the former G2 and G3 classes, built in 1919 and 1921 respectively, for Mantetsu and for the Manchukuo National Railway.

Original Class G2
In anticipation of the resumption of express passenger trains after the end of the First World War, Mantetsu imported six G2 class locomotives from Baldwin of the United States in 1919. These services were resumed between Dalian and Changchun in June 1921, and between Busan, Korea and Fengtian in July 1923. Initially used for express trains on the main line, they eventually began working on the Anfeng Line as well, moving express and ordinary passenger trains between Manchuria and Korea.

Initially designated class G2, in 1920 they were reclassified as Pashisa (パシサ) class. In 1933, the entire class was redesignated as Pashiha (パシハ) class, with the Pashisa class designation given to a class of locomotives built in Japan in the following year (the second Pashisa class). In 1934, all six units were transferred to the Manchukuo National Railway, becoming MNR class Pashina (パシナ) until the introduction of the unified classification system in 1938, when they became Pashishi (パシシ) class.

Original Class G3
Like the G2 class, the G3 class was built in anticipation of the restoration of express services after the end of the First World War. Like the Pashini class, these were built by Mantetsu's Shahekou Works, and were based on the earlier class, but with a design upgraded using new equipment imported from the United States, and had a larger tender to allow use over longer distances without needing to refuel. A total of 23 were built between 1921 and 1927. During the era of wooden passenger equipment, the G3 class became one of Mantetsu's signature locomotives, but they proved inadequate for use with express trains once heavier, all-steel passenger equipment was introduced. Replaced on those trains by the Pashiko class, the Pashishi class was relegated for use with ordinary passenger trains.

China Railway
At the end of the Second World War, the 29 locomotives of the Pashisa class (both former G2 and G3 classes) survived, and were assigned to the Dalian (7), Fengtian (11), Harbin (6) and Qiqihar Railway Bureaus (5). They were taken over by the Republic of China Railway in 1945; after the establishment of the People's Republic of China, they were classified class ㄆㄒ4 (PX4) by the China Railway in 1951, becoming class SL4 (勝利, Shènglì, "victory") in 1959.

References

4-6-2 locomotives
Baldwin locomotives
Shahekou Works locomotives
Railway locomotives introduced in 1919
Railway locomotives introduced in 1921
Steam locomotives of China
Standard gauge locomotives of China
Rolling stock of Manchukuo
Passenger locomotives